Raphael Miranda (born April 26, 1977) is an American meteorologist and weather producer at WNBC television in New York City.

Since 2009, Miranda serves as a weatherman for Weekend Today in New York, a primary fill-in meteorologist for the weekday newscasts and serves as the host of the Megaphone Interactive Trivia of Saturday Today in New York.

Early life and education
Miranda was born in Bedford Hills, New York, and graduated from New York University with a Bachelor of Arts degree in Spanish, with a concentration in Latin American literature, and a Bachelor of Science degree in broadcast journalism from Brooklyn College. Additionally, he earned a geosciences/meteorology degree from Mississippi State University.

Career
He started as a weather intern at WNBC in 2007. Since then he has appeared on national and local networks including MSNBC, CNBC World, News 12 Westchester and the now-defunct NBC Weather Plus. Miranda was also an occasional meteorologist for Early Today until Weather Plus shut down in December 2008.

Awards and memberships
Miranda won a 2011 Emmy Award for weather coverage of Hurricane Irene.

He is a member of organizations including the American Meteorological Society, the National Lesbian and Gay Journalists Association and the National Association of Hispanic Journalists.  Miranda holds the National Weather Association's seal of approval.

Personal life
Miranda, his husband and child  live in New Jersey.

Television

See also

 List of Brooklyn College alumni
 List of meteorologists
 List of Mississippi State University people
 List of New York University alumni
 List of people from New Jersey
 List of people from New York City

External links

References

1977 births
20th-century American scientists
21st-century American scientists
American male journalists
Brooklyn College alumni
American gay men
Gay scientists
Journalists from New Jersey
Journalists from New York City
LGBT Hispanic and Latino American people
American LGBT journalists
LGBT people from New Jersey
LGBT people from New York (state)
American LGBT scientists
Living people
Mississippi State University alumni
New York (state) television reporters
New York University alumni
People from Bedford Hills, New York

Scientists from New York City
Television meteorologists from New York (state)
Television meteorologists in New York City